Nagihan Karadere (born 27 December 1984) is a Turkish short-distance and hurdles runner. She is the first and only female athlete to run under 56sec in the 400m hurdles. Turkey's record rating in the 400m hurdles is 55.09 seconds. She competed in the Olympics, passing the threshold at the 2012 London Olympics.

She won a bronze medal in the 400 m hurdles event at the 2011 Summer Universiade held in Shenzhen, China and a silver medal in the 4 × 400 m relay event at the same competition.

Karadere set a new national record in 400 m hurdles event at the Turkish Super League Final held on July 31, 2011, in Ankara.

She qualified for participation in 400 m hurdles event at the 2012 Summer Olympics, where she was disqualified for a false start. She was a contestant in Turkish Survivor in 2016 in the Dominican Republic, and appeared in Survivor again in 2022.

Achievements

Competitions

References

External links
IAAF profile for Nagihan Karadere

1984 births
Living people
Turkish female sprinters
Olympic athletes of Turkey
Turkish female hurdlers
People from Kadirli
Athletes (track and field) at the 2012 Summer Olympics
Universiade medalists in athletics (track and field)
Universiade silver medalists for Turkey
Universiade bronze medalists for Turkey
Survivor Turkey contestants
Medalists at the 2011 Summer Universiade